Aravane Rezaï was the defending champion; however, she was eliminated by Sofia Arvidsson in the first round.

No. 16 seed Petra Kvitová won the title beating No. 4 seed Victoria Azarenka 7–6(7–3), 6–4 in the final. It was the first Premier Mandatory title for Kvitová and her third title of the year.

This tournament also marked the final professional match of Dinara Safina's career, where she lost to Julia Görges in the second round, after having ongoing injuries and eventually retired from tennis.

Seeds

Qualifying

Draw

Finals

Top half

Section 1

Section 2

Bottom half

Section 3

Section 4

References
Main Draw and Qualifying Draw

Women's Singles